Jan Hendrik Pelleboer (2 May 1924 – 18 July 1992) was a Dutch meteorologist and weather presenter best known for his entertaining style of presentation and who is credited for popularizing (amateur) meteorology among the Dutch public.

See also
List of meteorologists

References

External links
 Biography at Geheugen van Drenthe (in Dutch) 
 Sound clip from 1989

1928 births
1992 deaths
Dutch meteorologists
Dutch television presenters
Dutch radio presenters
Weather presenters
Television meteorologists
People from Kampen, Overijssel
20th-century Dutch people